Dr. Z may refer to:

People
 Dieter Zetsche, the Chairman of Daimler AG
 Paul Lionel Zimmerman, an American sportswriter
 Jonathan Zizmor, a New York dermatologist
 Lawrence Zidek, an Illinois Chiropractor

Fictional characters
 Doctor John Zoidberg a character in Futurama
 Dr. Z, a character in Dinosaur King
 The Diabolical Dr. Z, a Spanish-French 1965 horror film directed by Jesus Franco
 Dr. Z, a character in The Venture Bros.

Enterprises
 Dr. Z Amplification, a manufacturer of guitar amplifiers

See also
 Gordon Penrose ("Doctor Zed"), a Canadian science educator